Leptura kerniana is a species of beetle in the family Cerambycidae. It was described by Fall in 1907.

References

Lepturinae
Beetles described in 1907